Olpe may refer to
Olpe (container), an Ancient Greek jug for wine
Olpe, Kansas, a city in Kansas, United States
Olpe, Germany, a town in North Rhine-Westphalia, Germany
Olpe (district), a Kreis (district) of North Rhine-Westphalia, Germany
Olpe (Bigge), a river of North Rhine-Westphalia, Germany, tributary of the Bigge
Olpe (Hundem), a river of North Rhine-Westphalia, Germany, tributary of the Hundem